Henry Salwey (1794 – 10 March 1874) was a British Whig politician.

Salwey was first elected Whig MP for Ludlow in 1837, but lost the seat at the  next general election in 1841. Although he regained the seat in 1841, he again lost the next general election in 1852.

References

External links
 

Whig (British political party) MPs for English constituencies
UK MPs 1837–1841
UK MPs 1847–1852
1794 births
1874 deaths